Lucas Eduardo Lima da Silva (born 4 July 2000), known as Lucas Lima, is a Brazilian footballer who plays as a midfielder for Atlético Goianiense, on loan from São Bento.

Club career
A São Bento youth graduate, Lucas Lima joined their youth setup in 2017, aged 16. He made his first team debut on 30 November 2019, coming on as a late substitute for Minho in a 2–1 Série B away win over América Mineiro; his side was already relegated.

Lucas Lima subsequently returned to the under-20s before featuring rarely for the side during the 2020 season. In November of that year, he was loaned to Uberaba for the remainder of the Campeonato Mineiro Segunda Divisão.

Lucas Lima returned to Bentão in February 2021, but did not feature until the arrival of Paulo Roberto Santos as manager. On 18 October, he renewed his contract for a further year.

Lucas Lima began the 2022 season as a starter, and scored his first senior goal on 30 January, netting a last-minute equalizer in a 1–1 Campeonato Paulista Série A2 home draw against Primavera. On 29 March, he scored a brace in a 5–1 away routing of XV de Piracicaba, which led his side to the semifinals of the competition.

On 11 April 2022, Lucas Lima moved to Série A side Atlético Goianiense on loan until the end of the year. He made his debut in the category on 14 May, replacing Léo Pereira in a 0–2 away loss against Atlético Mineiro.

Career statistics

References

2000 births
Living people
Brazilian footballers
Association football midfielders
Campeonato Brasileiro Série A players
Campeonato Brasileiro Série B players
Campeonato Brasileiro Série C players
Campeonato Brasileiro Série D players
Esporte Clube São Bento players
Uberaba Sport Club players
Atlético Clube Goianiense players